Edward Charles Daniel Cocking FRS (born 26 September 1931) is a British plant scientist, and Emeritus Professor at University of Nottingham.

He was on the Board of Trustees of Royal Botanic Gardens, Kew, from 1983 to 1993.
He is on the  Board of Directors of Lawes Agricultural Trust Company and is a foreign fellow of the National Academy of Agricultural Sciences.

References

External links
"The Quest for Nitrogen Fixing Cereals"

British botanists
1931 births
Academics of the University of Nottingham
Fellows of the Royal Society
Living people
Place of birth missing (living people)
Fellows of the National Academy of Agricultural Sciences